This is a round-up of the 1988 Mayo Senior Football Championship. Castlebar Mitchels were champions this year, having repeated their 1986 victory over Crossmolina Deel Rovers, although after a replay.

Preliminary round

First round

Quarter finals

Semi-finals

Mayo Senior Football Championship Final

Mayo Senior Football Championship Final Replay

References

 Connaught Telegraph (Autumn 1988)
 Western People (Summer/Autumn 1988)

External links

Mayo Senior Football Championship
1988